Ferrets Magazine was published by BowTie Inc. (later named I-5 Publishing LLC) from 1997 until 2008, targeted at ferret owners. The magazine was based in Mission Viejo, California,. In April 2008, the magazine converted to an online-only format and merged with other material into the website Small Animal Channel, which also included coverage of rabbits and rodents.

References

External links
 Official website (defunct)

Animal and pet magazines
Defunct magazines published in the United States
Magazines
Magazines established in 1997
Magazines disestablished in 2008
Magazines published in California
Online magazines published in the United States
Online magazines with defunct print editions